Sandy Lam (born 26 April 1966), is a Hong Kong singer, actress and album producer. She rose to fame in the 1980s as a Cantopop diva, before expanding her fan base significantly in Asia, releasing more than 30 stylistically diverse albums in Cantonese, Mandarin, English and Japanese.

As one of the most famous figures in Chinese-language music of 20th and 21st centuries, Sandy is known not just for her commercial success; but also her ability to transform, and willingness to step outside of the frameworks of the genre and industries in which she operates. Her albums, Gaia (2012) and 0 (2018), each earned her a Golden Melody Award for Best Mandarin Female Singer.

Sandy has recorded not only with CBS Sony Records in 1980s, but also with Warner Music, Rock Records, Virgin Records, Capitol Records, EMI Music, and now Universal Music.

Early life

Born in Hong Kong on 26 April 1966 as the eldest of three children, Sandy Lam spent her early years in North Point. Music had always been a major part of the Lam family. Her father, emigrated from Shanghai, was a professional Erhu musician with the Hong Kong Chinese Orchestra and her mother performed Yue opera at local venues.

A DJ and an actress

In 1982, while still a secondary school student, Sandy was asked by a classmate to audition for a disc jockey position at the Commercial Radio Hong Kong. Soon after, she started working as a part-time DJ at Commercial Radio 2 with a stage name "611". In 1984, she became a full-time DJ and was spotted by Tony Lee of CBS/Sony Records for her talent during an outdoor performance singing Crying in the Rain. She was signed to CBS/Sony in 1985 and released her debut album in 1986. Meanwhile, Sandy acted in the movies Merry Christmas "聖誕快樂" (1984) and The Intellectual Trio "龍鳳智多星" (1985) and played the role of a nurse in a RTHK television series "左鄰右里" (1985).

Musical career

Sandy's musical career was not a breakout success. Her first Cantonese language album and corresponding imagery was heavily influenced by the Japanese idol craze. Yet despite the popularity of this style in Hong Kong, Sandy failed to strike a chord with the general public. It was not until her album Grey "灰色" (1987) that the locals started taking the former DJ seriously as a singer. Both the title song "灰色" and a cover version of Berlin's Take My Breath Away (from the movie Top Gun) "激情" shot up the charts, bringing Sandy her first awards at the 1987 Jade Solid Gold Best Ten Music Awards Presentation. She further showed her ability to transcend genres on the jazz-influenced Ready (1988).

City Rhythm

At this make-or-break stage of her career, it was the City Rhythm "都市觸覺" series that really launched her into the big leagues, where she has remained ever since. A trilogy of records released between 1988 and 1990, City Rhythm gave Hong Kongers a taste of her true musical and conceptual capabilities, going platinum in the process. Serving as Executive Producer, the albums were filled with glossy dance-pop bops and ballads originally recorded by Western artists. City Rhythm was the first successful execution of a concept record in Cantopop. Lyrically daring, the series was profoundly feminist; representing the female experience of life and love on the busy Hong Kong streets, and embodied a woman who refused to compromise her aims and desires, with each song taking on a specific aspect of life.

The song selection was also interesting: Sandy covered the songs of artists such as Martika and Taylor Dayne, positioning her as a fresh and youthful artist. Through this series, Sandy was not only able to encapsulate the glitz and glamour of 1980s Hong Kong and golden-era Cantopop, but also embody its youthfulness and ambition. A collection of corresponding remix records solidified her as Hong Kong's dancing queen.

Wildflower

In 1991, Sandy worked with Singaporean songwriter Dick Lee and released the coming-of-age album Wildflower "野花". With wildflowers being a metaphorical representation of the mental journey of a modern Asian woman, Wildflower was a stunning collection of contemporary east-meets-west music. Marrying traditional themes and western jazz influences, Wildflower not only made people recognize the versatility and artistic talent of Sandy, but initiated the ‘Unplugged’ craze of early 90s Cantonese music – the creation of authentic and raw musical products that connected with the listener more intimately. Although reception was at first lukewarm, it was eventually recognized as a pioneering work in the Cantonese musical canon, and is now rightly regarded as one of the most important and culturally defining albums of Cantopop.

Home Again Without You

Simultaneously, Sandy was also developing her Taiwanese market and establishing herself in the world of Mandopop. Her debut Mandarin language album, Home Again Without You "愛上一個不回家的人" (1990), was not only a huge commercial success selling over 600,000 copies in Taiwan alone, but was seen as a watershed moment in Cantopop: the success prompted many Hong Kong musicians to test the waters of Mandopop, ushering in the start of Taiwan’s regional dominance in pop music.

Love, Sandy

In 1995 she paired up with Taiwanese music producer Jonathan Lee and released her fourth Mandarin album Love, Sandy. A ten-track collection of ballads, love songs and R&B-inspired pop, the album was a commercial blockbuster selling 800,000 copies in Taiwan and 3 million across Asia, cementing her in new markets including Singapore and Mainland China. Almost every song became a hit record, with many becoming KTV standards. To date it remains one of the best-selling albums in Mandopop history.

Upon release of 14th Cantopop album Feeling Perfect "感覺完美" (1996), Sandy spent most of her time in Taiwan, China, and Japan. Sandy made a brief foray onto the stage in 1997 when she was cast as the female lead in Hong Kong's biggest musical Snow.Wolf.Lake "雪·狼·湖", the production went on to play 42 consecutive sold out performances in the Hong Kong Coliseum which remains the record today.

At Least I Still Have You

After a hiatus lasting years following the birth of her daughter, she re-emerged and released a steady stream of Mandarin albums into the mid-00s, honing her capabilities and continuing to push herself creatively. Works during this time included Clang Rose "鏗鏘玫瑰" (1999), critically praised for being avant-garde yet commercially viable, and Sandy Lam's "林憶蓮’S" (2000) which included mega-hit At Least I Still Have You "至少還有你". A Korean remake of the song, sung by Super Junior-M, a sub-group of the K-Pop band Super Junior, was released on their Me album titled Dangsinigie (당신이기에) in 2008. From a lyrical perspective, Sandy took on a greater song-writing role for the first time on Truly… Sandy "原來…林憶蓮" (2001), where she co-wrote four songs. In the same year, Sandy appeared as cast member of an Andrew Lloyd Webber concert Masterpiece in Beijing and Shanghai, which also featured West End and Broadway star Elaine Paige and China's all-time best-selling recording artist Kris Phillips. In April 2002, she was invited to sing the Mandarin theme song, On My Own "屬於我", when Cameron Mackintosh staged Les Misérables in Shanghai.

In 2005, Sandy released her first Cantonese album in almost ten years: True Colour "本色". Following the Mandarin Breathe Me "呼吸" (2006) album, it would be over six years until we heard from Sandy again on record. Using this time to tour, Sandy also considered next steps for her music. From 2009, Sandy slowly began working on an album that she wanted to be different from anything she had done previously. Rather than playing safe and being too reliant on other producers and songwriters, Sandy wanted to make a fundamental change to the way she made music.

Gaia

In 2012 Sandy released Gaia "蓋亞". Titled after the Goddess of earth in Greek mythology, the album was boldly experimental in which she experimented with New Age sounds, adding spice to her repertoire.

Gaia was praised not only as a triumphant comeback, but held up as a landmark album in Mandopop. Lauded by critics as a forward-thinking and ground-breaking record, she was awarded four awards at the 24th Golden Melody Awards in 2013, including "Best Mandarin Female Singer" as well as "Best Mandarin Album", "Best Album Producer" and "Best Musical Arranger".

Sandy continued to challenge herself in other avenues, for example in 2017 she was a surprise entrant in a Hunan Television show Singer 2017, which introduced her as a pop icon to a whole new generation of fans.

Re: Workz and In Search of Lost Time

She returned to Cantopop briefly, harking back to her early days by releasing two albums of cover songs from 1980s Hong Kong, namely Re: Workz (2014) and In Search of Lost Time "陪著我走" (2016), rearranging and adapting the songs to different styles and genres.

0

In 2018, Sandy released her 12th Mandarin album 0 under negligible promotional-fanfare. Three years in the making, 0 continued Sandy's path of challenging herself musically. Releasing her first single "Core", for the second time collaborate with Mayday's main vocalist Ashin. A deeply emotional yet analytical affair, 0 is a record that tries to understand and explain the many concepts of zero, including the idea of beginnings and endings. Sandy won "Best Mandarin Female Singer" and "Best Recording Vocal Album" awards for this album at the 30th Golden Melody Awards in 2019.

Major Awards

Singer 2017
In January 2017, Sandy joined Hunan Television's show Singer 2017, as one of the eight initial singers (contestants who entered the competition on the first week with exemption in the Breakout round). She was declared the winner in the final on 15 April 2017.

Personal life

Sandy married Taiwanese singer-songwriter and producer Jonathan Lee in 1998. They have a daughter together, Renee (李喜兒), born on 17 May 1998. Sandy and Jonathan Lee divorced in 2004. Sandy was in an eight-year relationship with the drummer-songwriter Jun Kung from 2011 to 2019.

Discography

Cantonese albums

Sandy Lam (林憶蓮) – Released April 1985
Let Alone (放縱) – Released March 1986
Sandy (憶蓮) – Released 19 February 1987
Grey (灰色) – Released 21 August 1987
Ready – Released 8 June 1988
City Rhythm I (都市觸覺 Part I City Rhythm) – Released 15 December 1988
City Rhythm Take Two (City Rhythm Take Two) EP – Released April 1989
City Rhythm II (都市觸覺 Part II 逃離鋼筋森林) – Released 24 October 1989
Dynamic Reaction (都市觸覺之推搪) EP – Released 27 March 1990
Part III - Faces And Places (都市觸覺 Part III Faces And Places) – Released 28 August 1990
Dance Mega Mix (傾斜都市燒燒燒) EP – Released December 1990
Drifting (夢了、瘋了、倦了) – Released 14 February 1991
Wildflower (野花) – Released December 1991
Come Back To Love (回來愛的身邊) – Released 8 October 1992
Begin Again (不如重新開始) – Released 29 April 1993
Sandy '94 – Released June 1994
Feeling Perfect (感覺完美) – Released January 1996
Love Returns (回歸) EP – Released October 1996
Encore (Encore) EP – Released June 2002
S/L (本色) – Released 10 November 2005
Re: Workz – Released 17 January 2014
In Search of Lost Time (陪著我走) – Released 16 May 2016

Mandarin albums

Home Again Without You (愛上一個不回家的人) – Released December 1990
City Heart (都市心) – Released October 1991
Doesn't Matter Who I Am (不必在乎我是誰) – Released May 1993
Love, Sandy – Released January 1995
Night's Too Dark (夜太黑) – Released July 1996
Clang Rose (鏗鏘玫瑰) – Released 28 January 1999
Sandy Lam's (林憶蓮's) – Released 18 January 2000
2001 Sandy (2001蓮) – Released December 2000
Truly... (原來…) – Released 1 December 2001
Breathe Me (呼吸) – Released 26 August 2006
Gaia (蓋亞) – Released 20 September 2012
0 (0) – Released 21 December 2018

Japanese albums

Simple – Released March 1994
Open Up – Released March 1995

English albums

I Swear (愛是唯一) – Released February 1996
Wonderful World (美妙世界) – Released January 1997

Singles 

 "Color of the Moon" (September 2006)
 "We Are One" (April 2014)
 "I Will Not Forget You" (我不能忘記你) (April 2017)
 "Shuang Ying" (雙影) (August 2018)

Compilations

Her Story With Mayday (June 2015), presenting song "Eternal Summer" (盛夏光年)

Filmography

Motion pictures

Television

Published Work

References

External links

 Sandy Lam on YouTube
 
 
 
 Sandy Lam on Filmography
Sandy and Me

1966 births
Living people
Cantopop singers
Hong Kong Mandopop singers
20th-century Hong Kong women singers
21st-century Hong Kong women singers
English-language singers from Hong Kong
Hong Kong television actresses
Hong Kong film actresses